Hill West Architects (formerly Goldstein, Hill & West Architects) is a New York City based architecture firm which works on the planning and design of high-rise residential and hospitality buildings, retail structures and multi-use complexes. They have participated in the design of prominent structures in the New York City metropolitan area. The firm was founded in 2009 by Alan Goldstein, L. Stephen Hill and David West.

History 
The co-founders of Hill West are members of the American Institute of Architects. In 2017, the firm's name was changed from Goldstein, Hill & West Architects to Hill West Architects. The decision to rebrand and rename reflects the retirement of longtime partner, Alan Goldstein, who co-founded Goldstein, Hill & West in 2008.

Projects 

Lead Architect
Plaza Hotel - 768 Fifth Avenue

Architect
1 Flatbush Avenue
56 Fulton Street
151 Maiden Lane
160 Riverside Boulevard
161 Maiden Lane
180 6th Avenue
22 Central Park South
220 Riverside Boulevard
261 West 25th Street
310 West 52nd Street
363-365 Bond Street
400 West End Avenue
42-12 28th Street
511-521 9th Avenue 

605 West 42nd Street
775 Columbus Avenue
795 Columbus Avenue
805 Columbus Avenue
808 Columbus Avenue 
One Riverside Park
Reade Chambers - 71 Reade Street
Silver Towers - 620 West 42nd Street
The Aldyn - 60 Riverside Boulevard 
The Continental - 885 6th Avenue
The Heritage - 240 Riverside Boulevard
The Laurel - 400 E 67th Street
The Rushmore - 80 Riverside Boulevard
Tower 28
The Toy Building - 1107 Broadway
Trump Place - 180 Riverside Boulevard
York Tower II - 1113 York Avenue

Executive Architect
56 Leonard Street
71 Smith Street
200/300 North End Avenue 
221 West 29th Street
224 Mulberry Street
234-238 East 23rd Street
250 West Street
508 West 24th Street

Source if not otherwise specified:

Whitehall Interiors NYC 

In February 2014, Hill West launched Whitehall Interiors NYC, a New York City-based, affiliated interior design firm focused on the creation of interiors for residential and commercial properties. The firm's projects have included the lobby renovation of The Feil Organization's 7 Penn Plaza and 488 Madison Avenue.

Notable projects include:
 221 West 29th Street, a 95-unit mid-rise luxury rental
 86 Fleet Place - a 440-unit high-rise luxury rental in Brooklyn
 42-12 28th Street - a 477-unit high-rise luxury rental in Long Island City
 Renovations of the lobbies at The Feil Organization's 7 Penn Plaza and 488 Madison Avenue

Awards and honors 

2013 - Architectural Record Top 5 Design Firms (#2)
2014 - Crain's New York Business Fast 50
2014 - Architectural Record Top 5 Design Firms (#3)
2014 - Architectural Record Top 300 Architecture Firms
2016 - The Real Deal Top New York Architects 2016

References

External links 
 Hill West Architects

Architecture firms based in New York City
Design companies established in 2009